Berlin Dungeon is a tourist attraction from a chain including the London Dungeon and Hamburg Dungeon. It provides a journey through Berlin's dark history in an actor led, interactive experience. There are both German and English shows and the  actors speak German and English.

Attractions
Elevator of Doom
Old Library of Berlin
River Raft Ride
Plagued Street
Torture Chamber
The Secret Court
Lost Catacombs
The White Lady
The Butcher of Berlin

Parent company 
The Berlin Dungeon also has sister sites at the Hamburg Dungeon, London Dungeon, York Dungeon and Amsterdam Dungeon. Each Dungeon is based on the same theme but investigates the history of its area. The sites are owned by Poole based Merlin Entertainments.

See also 
 Merlin Entertainments
 Torture Museums

References

External links
The Berlin Dungeon

The Berlin Dungeon Review

Tourist attractions in Berlin